Cha Gonzalez is a French photographer, videographer, and documentary filmmaker. Her Abandon series, published in several magazines, was selected for the 2018 Virginia Prize.

Life 
Gonzalez grew up in  Lebanon. She studied at École des beaux-arts de Bordeaux, and École nationale supérieure des arts décoratifs.

Her work has appeared in  Le Monde , The Wall Street Journal , Elle , Liberation , Grazia and Causette.

She is based in Paris.

References

External links 

 Official website

1985 births
French photographers
Living people